Herbert "Dusty" Fahrnow (January 18, 1903 in Huntington, Indiana – May 25, 1981 in Contra Costa, California) was an American racecar driver.

Indianapolis 500 results

References

1903 births
1981 deaths
Indianapolis 500 drivers
People from Huntington, Indiana
Racing drivers from Indiana